The A103 is an A road in London, England.

Route
It runs from Lower Holloway to Hornsey and includes Hornsey Road, Hornsey Rise, Crouch End Hill, Broadway Parade, Tottenham Lane, before ending in Church Lane, Hornsey.

North London Derby
The northern end of this road is called Tottenham Lane but actually it is Arsenal whose stadium (Emirates Stadium, originally Highbury Stadium) it will go past at the other end.

Former train line
Crosses the route of the former Seven Sisters to Alexandra Palace railway line.

References 

Roads in England
Streets in the London Borough of Haringey
Streets in the London Borough of Islington